The Filson Club History Quarterly was an academic journal of American history (focusing on history of the Ohio Valley and Kentucky) published by the Filson Historical Society. It was originally established as The Historical Quarterly in 1926 by Robert S. Cotterill, to supplement The Filson Club Publications, a series of monographs published by the club. Other editors of the journal include Otto A. Rothert (1928–1945), Lucien Beckner (1946), Richard H. Hill (1947–1971), Robert E. McDowell, Jr. (1971–1975), Nelson L. Dawson (1975–?).

The journal took the name The Historical Quarterly of the Filson Club in 1929, and The Filson Club History Quarterly the following year. It took the name Filson History Quarterly for its last two volumes (vol. 75 and 76) in 2001 and 2002. The journal was absorbed by Ohio Valley History, published by the Cincinnati Historical Society, in 2003.

In 2010, all articles were digitized and are now accessible through the Filson Club website.

Further reading

References

External links
Filson Club website

Publications established in 1926
Publications disestablished in 2002
History of the United States journals
1926 establishments in Kentucky
2002 disestablishments in Kentucky
Quarterly journals
Defunct journals of the United States
Defunct mass media in Louisville, Kentucky